Wand Records was an American independent record label, started by Florence Greenberg in 1961 as a subsidiary of Scepter Records. Artists on Wand Records included The Isley Brothers, The Kingsmen, Mel Wynn & the Rhythm Aces, Chuck Jackson, and the Monzas.

In 1976, Greenberg retired from the business and sold her record labels to Springboard International. When Springboard went bankrupt, Gusto Records acquired the catalog. The Kingsmen acquired full ownership of their Wand catalog in court from Gusto for non-payment of royalties.

Wand label artists
Chuck Jackson was the first artist signed to Wand. His single "I Don't Want to Cry" (Wand 106) went to No. 36 on the Billboard Hot 100 and No. 5 on the R&B chart in 1961. The Isley Brothers released their classic single "Twist and Shout" (Wand 124), which peaked at No. 17 on the Hot 100 and No. 2 on the R&B chart in 1962. In 1963, the Kingsmen released "Louie Louie" (Wand 143), which reached No. 2 on the Hot 100. Maxine Brown had a number for singles released on the label, including "Oh No Not My Baby" (Wand 162) in 1964.

Some artists to have one-off releases include Benny Gordon with "Gonna Give Her All The Love I Got", and a singer called Al Wilson. For some time there has been speculation and discussion among some Northern soul collectors and enthusiasts that the single "Help Me", composed and produced by Johnny Northern and Ralph Bailey, arranged by Robert Banks, is not the same Al Wilson who recorded "The Snake". It is believed by some that this may be a completely different singer who happened to have the same name.

List of artists

 Al Wilson
 Benny Gordon
 B.J. Thomas
 Bobby Bland
 Brenton Wood
 Canned Heat
 Chuck Jackson
 Clarence Reid
 Dee Clark
 Don and the Goodtimes
 The Esquires
 Freddie Hughes
 General Crook (musician)
  The Independents
 Isley Brothers
 Jackie Moore
 Jimmie Green
 Joe Jeffrey Group
 Johnny Copeland
 The Kingsmen
 The Last Five
 L.C. Cooke
 Lois Lane
 The Masqueraders
 Maxine Brown
 Mel Wynn & the Rhythm Aces
 The Monzas
 The Moving Sidewalks
 Nella Dodds
 The Next Five
 Roscoe Robinson
 Shirelles
 South Shore Commission
 Tammy Montgomery (Tammi Terrell)
 Timmy Shaw
 Walter Lee & the Leeds
 Dionne Warwick

See also
 List of record labels

References

External links
The Scepter/Wand Story
Wand Album Discography at bsnpubs.com
Wand Singles Discography at globaldogproductions.com

American record labels
Record labels established in 1961
Record labels disestablished in 1976